The Socialist Party of Cantabria-PSOE (PSC-PSOE) is the Cantabrian federation of the Spanish Socialist Workers' Party (PSOE), the main centre-left party in Spain since the 1970s.

Electoral performance

Parliament of Cantabria

Cortes Generales

European Parliament

References

Cantabria
Political parties in Cantabria
Political parties with year of establishment missing
Social democratic parties in Spain